Alexander Parker may refer to:

 Alex Parker (1935–2010), Scottish international footballer 
 Alexander Parker (politician) (1891–1960s), Australian politician
 Alexander Parker (Quaker), (1628–1689), British preacher and author
 Alexander Parker (Medal of Honor) (1832–1900), United States Navy sailor and Medal of Honor recipient

See also
Al Parker (disambiguation)